Pleroma semidecandrum, synonym Tibouchina semidecandra, the princess flower, glory bush, or lasiandra, is a flowering plant in the family Melastomataceae, native to southeast Brazil.

Description
It is a sprawling, evergreen shrub or small ornamental tree native to Brazil and ranges from 10 to 15 feet (20 feet with proper training) in height. The dark green, velvety, four to six-inch-long leaves have several prominent longitudinal veins instead of the usual one, and are often edged in red. 

Large, royal purple blossoms, flaring open to five inches, are held on terminal panicles above the foliage, creating a spectacular sight when in full bloom. Some flowers are open throughout the year but they are especially plentiful from May to January.

Cultivation
Plant in full sun for best color and maximum flowering. They can tolerate the shade but will not thrive. Princess-Flower is ideal for the mixed shrubbery border or used in small groupings to compound the impact of bloom-time.

Plant in most soils with good drainage and a slightly acid mix is even better. Nematodes can affect Tibouchina and over watering can contribute to mushroom root-rot. It can be trimmed to any size and still put on a vivid, year-long flower display.

Chemistry 
Pleroma semidecandrum contains the dimeric ellagitannin nobotanin B.

References 

semidecandrum
Trees of Brazil